The 1976–77 Michigan Wolverines men's basketball team represented the University of Michigan in intercollegiate college basketball during the 1976–77 season. The team played its home games in the Crisler Arena in Ann Arbor, Michigan, and was a member of the Big Ten Conference.  Under the direction of head coach Johnny Orr, the team won the Big Ten Conference Championship.

Season review
The team earned the last of four consecutive NCAA Division I men's basketball tournament invitations.  Steve Grote and John Robinson served as team captains, while Phil Hubbard earned team MVP. As a team, they led the conference in scoring offense with an 83.2 average in conference games as well as scoring margin with a 9.4 average. The team began and ended the season ranked number one in the Associated Press Top Twenty Poll and was ranked all seventeen weeks, including eight at number one.  The team also ended the season ranked atop the final UPI Coaches' Poll.

On December 29, 1976, Hubbard became the first Wolverine to play 50 minutes in a game against Providence. In 1980, Mike McGee would play 54 minutes in a game.  The team's 21 for 22 performance on February 17 against Indiana was the school free throw percentage record until February 21, 1987.  The team totaled 17 steals on February 26, 1977, as both Rickey Green and Hubbard had 6 against Michigan State, which lasted as a school record until December 3, 1994.  Green had 7 steals on November 27, 1976, against , which remains unsurpassed in school history.

Post season
In the 32-team 1977 NCAA Division I men's basketball tournament, Michigan reached the elite eight in the Mideast region by defeating the  92–81 and the Detroit Titans 86–81. The team then fell to the Charlotte 49ers 75–68.  In the game against the Detroit Titans on March 17, Hubbard totaled 26 rebounds, which is an NCAA Division I men's basketball tournament single-game record (since 1973).

NCAA tournament summary
Mideast
Michigan 92, Holy Cross 81
 Michigan 86, Detroit 81
Charlotte 75, Michigan 68

Roster

David Baxter
Tom Bergen
Thomas Bergen 
Steve Grote (C)
Rickey Green
Alan Hardy
Phil Hubbard
Robert Jones
William Lelich
Len Lillard
Mark Lozier
John Robinson (C)
Thomas Staton
David Stavale
Joel Thompson
Head Coach: Johnny Orr
Assistants: Jim Boyce, Dan Fife, Bill Frieder

Accomplishments
The team was led by Consensus second team All-Americans Ricky Green and Phil Hubbard. That season, Hubbard set the current school single-season total rebound record of 389, surpassing M. C. Burton, Jr.'s 1959 total of 379.  He also surpassed Bill Buntin's 1963 single-season total of 23 point-rebound double doubles with 24.  Grote's career assist total of 358 would stand as a school record for 7 seasons until eclipsed by Eric Turner, while Ricky Green's career assist average of 4.05 per game would also be a record until eclipsed by Turner.  For the season Green totaled 61 steals for a 2.18 average, which stood as school records until Gary Grant totaled 84 and averaged 2.55 in 1986.  Grote's 116 career games played lasted as a Michigan record until 1986 when Richard Rellford totaled 124, while his 108 career starts stood as a record until Mike McGee totaled 112 in 1981. The team set the school single-season free throws made record of 510, which surpassed the 1965 mark of 494 and would last until 1989.  The team set the school single-season total steals record of 263 that stood until 1986.  Green ended his career with an average of 32.7 minutes per game, which was a school record tied by Phil Hubbard two years later and surpassed by Mike McGee.

Statistics
The team posted the following statistics:

Rankings

Team players drafted into the NBA
Six players from this team were selected in the NBA Draft.

See also
 NCAA Men's Division I Tournament bids by school
 NCAA Men's Division I Tournament bids by school and conference
 NCAA Division I men's basketball tournament all-time team records

References

Michigan
Michigan
Michigan Wolverines men's basketball seasons
Michigan Wolverines men's basketball team
Michigan Wolverines men's basketball team